Saeb or SAEB may refer to:

Saeb
Saeb, Saib, is an Arabic male name. The following individuals are named "Saeb": 
Saeb Tabrizi or Saib Tabrizi, Medieval Persian poet
Saeb Erekat, Palestinian official
Saeb N. Jaroudi, Lebanese official
Saeb Jendeya, Palestinian footballer
Saeb Salam, former Lebanese Prime Minister
Saeb Shawkat, Iraqi surgeon

SAEB
 BCS Professional Certification, formerly known as the Systems Analysis Examination Board